Haliotis unilateralis is a species of sea snail, a marine gastropod mollusk in the family Haliotidae, the abalones.

Description
The size of the shell varies between 20 mm and 40 mm.

Distribution
This species occurs in the Red Sea and in the Indian Ocean off Aldabra, Kenya, Madagascar, Mauritius, Mozambique, and Tanzania.

References

 Geiger D.L. & Poppe G.T. (2000). A Conchological Iconography: The family Haliotidae. Conchbooks, Hackenheim Germany. 135pp 83pls.

External links
 

unilateralis
Gastropods described in 1822